Vladimir Anatolyevich Yakovlev (born November 25, 1944, in Olyokminsk, Yakutia, Soviet Union) is a former Russian  politician.

Biography 
Yakovlev is an ethnic Ingrian Finn according to his mother's bloodline. He is a candidate of technical sciences, a doctor of economics, a professor of the department of urban economy at Peter the Great St.Petersburg Polytechnic University, an honorary doctor of St. Petersburg State University of Economics and Finance, and an academician of the International Academy of Engineering.

During 1996–2003, he was the Governor of Saint Petersburg.

During 2003–2004, prior to the Beslan school hostage crisis, he was Presidential Plenipotentiary Envoy to the Southern Federal District. From 13 September 2004 until 24 September 2007, he was Russia's Minister for Regional Development in Mikhail Fradkov's Second Cabinet.

28 April 2009 Yakovlev was elected as the president of the Russian Union of Builders and still holds this position as in June 2022.

See also
Saint Petersburg City Administration

References

External links
Official biography (in Russian)

1944 births
Living people
People from Olyokminsky District
Communist Party of the Soviet Union members
Members of the Federation Council of Russia (1996–2000)
Governors of Saint Petersburg
Recipients of the Order of Honour (Russia)